Saline City is an unincorporated community in Sugar Ridge Township, Clay County, Indiana. It is part of the Terre Haute Metropolitan Statistical Area.

History
Saline City had its start by the building of the railroad through that territory. A post office was established at Saline City in 1872, and remained in operation until it was discontinued in 1951. Saline likely refers to a mineral lick.

Geography

References

Unincorporated communities in Clay County, Indiana
Unincorporated communities in Indiana
Terre Haute metropolitan area
1872 establishments in Indiana
Populated places established in 1872